The 1998 United States House of Representatives elections were held on November 3, 1998, to elect U.S. Representatives to serve in the 106th United States Congress. They were part of the midterm elections held during President Bill Clinton's second term. They were a major disappointment for the Republicans, who were expecting to gain seats due to the embarrassment Clinton suffered during the Monica Lewinsky scandal and the "six-year itch" effect observed in most second-term midterm elections. However, the Republicans lost five seats to the Democrats, although they retained a narrow majority in the House. A wave of Republican discontent with Speaker Newt Gingrich prompted him to resign shortly after the election; he was replaced by Congressman Dennis Hastert of Illinois.

The campaign was marked by Republican attacks on the morality of President Bill Clinton, with Independent Counsel Kenneth Starr having released his report on the Lewinsky scandal and House leaders having initiated an inquiry into whether impeachable offenses had occurred. However, exit polls indicated that most voters opposed impeaching Clinton, and predictions of high Republican or low Democratic turnout due to the scandal failed to materialize. Some speculate that the losses reflected a backlash against the Republicans for attacking the popular Clinton. With the Republicans having lost four House seats and failing to gain any seats in the Senate, it was the first time since 1934 that the non-presidential party failed to gain congressional seats in a midterm election; this would happen again in 2002. It was also the first time since 1822 that the non-presidential party had failed to gain House seats in the midterm election of a president's second term.

Overall results 

Source: Election Statistics - Office of the Clerk

Incumbent retirements

Democrats 
 : Vic Fazio
 : Esteban Edward Torres
 : Jane Harman: To run for Governor
 : David Skaggs
 : Barbara B. Kennelly: To run for Governor
 : Sidney R. Yates
 : Glenn Poshard: To run for Governor
 : Lee H. Hamilton
 : Scotty Baesler: To run for U.S. Senate
 : Joseph P. Kennedy II
 : Thomas J. Manton
 : Chuck Schumer: To run for U.S. Senate
 : Bill Hefner
 : Louis Stokes
 : Elizabeth Furse
 : Paul McHale
 : Henry B. González

Republicans 
 : Frank Riggs: To run for U.S. Senate
 : Daniel Schaefer
 : Mike Crapo: To run for U.S. Senate
 : Harris W. Fawell
 : Jim Bunning: To run for U.S. Senate
 : Michael Parker: To run for Governor
 : Jon Lynn Christensen: To run for Governor
 : John Ensign: To run for U.S. Senate
 : Gerald Solomon
 : Bill Paxon
 : Robert Freeman Smith
 : Joseph M. McDade
 : Bob Inglis: To run for U.S. Senate
 : Linda Smith: To run for U.S. Senate
 : Mark Neumann: To run for U.S. Senate
 : Scott L. Klug

Incumbents defeated

In primary elections

Republicans who lost to a Republican challenger 
 : Jay Kim lost to Gary Miller who later won the general election

In the general election

Democrats who lost to a Republican challenger 
 : Jay W. Johnson lost to Mark Andrew Green

Republicans who lost to a Democratic challenger 
 : Vince Snowbarger lost to Dennis Moore
 : Michael James Pappas lost to Rush Holt Jr.
 : Bill Redmond lost to Tom Udall
 : Jon D. Fox lost to Joe Hoeffel
 : Rick White lost to Jay Inslee

Special elections

Alabama

Alaska

Arizona

Arkansas

California

Colorado

Connecticut

Delaware

Florida

Georgia

Hawaii

Idaho

Illinois

Indiana

Iowa

Kansas

Kentucky

Louisiana

Maine

Maryland

Massachusetts

Michigan

Minnesota

Mississippi

Missouri

Montana

Nebraska

Nevada

New Hampshire

New Jersey

New Mexico

New York

North Carolina

North Dakota

Ohio

Oklahoma

Oregon

Pennsylvania

Rhode Island

South Carolina

South Dakota

Tennessee

Texas

Utah

Vermont

Virginia

Washington

West Virginia

Wisconsin

Wyoming

See also
 105th United States Congress
 106th United States Congress

References 
 Wattenberg; Martin P. "The Democrats' Decline in the House during the Clinton Presidency: An Analysis of Partisan Swings" Presidential Studies Quarterly, Vol. 29, 1999

External links